The Binnington Carr Hoard is a Roman coin hoard dating from the late 1st century AD. It contains 12 silver denarii within a copper alloy bell. It is in the collection of the Yorkshire Museum.

Contents
The hoard contains 12 silver coins all of which are denarii: one of Julius Caesar (49-44 BC), one of Nero (AD 54-68), three of Vitellius (AD 68) and seven of Vespasian (AD 69-79).

Display
In 2014 it featured in an online Google Arts & Culture exhibition titled 'Yorkshire Hoards'.

References

External links
Binnington Carr Hoard in a Google Arts & Culture online exhibition

1876 in England
1876 archaeological discoveries
Archaeological sites in North Yorkshire
Collections of the Yorkshire Museum
Hoards from Roman Britain
Coin hoards